Chuen Chom is a district (amphoe) in the north of Maha Sarakham province, northeastern Thailand.

Geography
Neighboring districts are (from the south clockwise): Chiang Yuen of Maha Sarakham Province; Sam Sung and Kranuan of Khon Kaen province; Huai Mek and Yang Talat of Kalasin province.

History
The minor district (king amphoe) was split off from Chiang Yuen district on 1 July 1997.

The Thai government on 15 May 2007 upgraded all 81 minor districts to full districts. With publication in the Royal Gazette on 24 August the upgrade became official.

Administration
The district is divided into four sub-districts (tambons), which are further subdivided into 47 villages (mubans). There are no municipal (thesabans). There are four tambon administrative organizations (TAO).

References

External links
amphoe.com

Chun Chom